The 2019 ATP Tour was the global elite men's professional tennis circuit organised by the Association of Tennis Professionals (ATP) for the 2019 tennis season. The 2019 ATP Tour calendar comprised the Grand Slam tournaments (supervised by the International Tennis Federation (ITF)), the ATP Tour Masters 1000, the ATP Finals, the ATP Tour 500 series, the ATP Tour 250 series and Davis Cup (organised by the ITF). Also included in the 2019 calendar were the Hopman Cup, the Laver Cup and the Next Gen ATP Finals which do not distribute ranking points. For the Masters series events the ATP introduced a shot clock. Players had a minute to come on court, 5 minutes to warmup, and then a minute to commence play, as well as 25 seconds between points.

Schedule
This was the complete schedule of events on the 2019 calendar.

January

February

March

April

May

June

July

August

September

October

November

Statistical information
These tables present the number of singles (S), doubles (D), and mixed doubles (X) titles won by each player and each nation during the season, within all the tournament categories of the 2019 ATP Tour: the Grand Slam tournaments, the ATP Finals, the ATP Tour Masters 1000, the ATP Tour 500 series, and the ATP Tour 250 series. The players/nations are sorted by:
 Total number of titles (a doubles title won by two players representing the same nation counts as only one win for the nation);
 Cumulated importance of those titles (one Grand Slam win equalling two Masters 1000 wins, one undefeated ATP Finals win equalling one-and-a-half Masters 1000 win, one Masters 1000 win equalling two 500 events wins, one 500 event win equalling two 250 events wins);
 A singles > doubles > mixed doubles hierarchy;
 Alphabetical order (by family names for players).

Titles won by player

Titles won by nation

Titles information

The following players won their first main circuit title in singles, doubles or mixed doubles:
Singles
 Tennys Sandgren – Auckland (draw)
 Alex de Minaur – Sydney (draw)
 Juan Ignacio Londero – Córdoba (draw)
 Reilly Opelka – New York (draw)
 Laslo Đere – Rio de Janeiro (draw)
 Radu Albot – Delray Beach (draw)
 Guido Pella – São Paulo (draw)
 Cristian Garín – Houston (draw)
 Adrian Mannarino – Rosmalen (draw)
 Lorenzo Sonego – Antalya (draw)
 Taylor Fritz – Eastbourne (draw)
 Nicolás Jarry – Båstad (draw)
 Dušan Lajović – Umag (draw)
 Hubert Hurkacz – Winston-Salem (draw)
 Denis Shapovalov – Stockholm (draw)
Doubles
 David Goffin – Doha (draw)
 Kevin Krawietz – New York (draw)
 Andreas Mies – New York (draw)
 Sander Gillé – Båstad (draw)
 Joran Vliegen – Båstad (draw)
 Romain Arneodo – Los Cabos (draw)
 Hugo Nys – Los Cabos (draw)
 Igor Zelenay – St. Petersburg (draw)
 Nikola Ćaćić – Chengdu (draw)
Mixed doubles
 Rajeev Ram – Australian Open (draw)

The following players defended a main circuit title in singles, doubles, or mixed doubles:
Singles
 Rafael Nadal – Rome (draw), French Open (draw), Montreal (draw)
 Novak Djokovic – Wimbledon (draw)
 Nikoloz Basilashvili – Hamburg (draw)
 Roger Federer – Basel (draw)

Doubles
 Horacio Zeballos – Buenos Aires (draw)
 Federico Delbonis – São Paulo (draw)
 Máximo González – São Paulo (draw)
 Bob Bryan – Miami (draw)
 Mike Bryan – Miami (draw)
 Juan Sebastián Cabal – Rome (draw)
 Robert Farah – Rome (draw)
 Oliver Marach – Geneva (draw)
 Mate Pavić – Geneva (draw)
 Dominic Inglot – Rosmalen (draw)
 Robin Haase – Umag (draw)
Mixed doubles
 Ivan Dodig – French Open (draw)
 Jamie Murray – US Open (draw)

Best ranking
The following players achieved a career-high ranking this season in the top 50 (bold indicates players who entered the top 10 for the first time):
Singles

Doubles

ATP ranking
These are the ATP rankings and yearly ATP race rankings of the top 20 singles players, doubles players and doubles teams at the current date of the 2019 season.

Singles

No. 1 ranking

Doubles

No. 1 ranking

Best matches by ATPTour.com

Best 6 Grand Slam tournament matches

Best 6 ATP Tour matches

Point distribution

Prize  money leaders

Retirements
Following is a list of notable players (winners of a main tour title, and/or part of the ATP rankings top 100 [singles] or top 100 [doubles] for at least one week) who returned from retirement, announced their retirement from professional tennis, became inactive (after not playing for more than 52 weeks), or were permanently banned from playing, during the 2019 season:

  Nicolás Almagro (born 21 August 1985 in Murcia, Spain) joined the professional tour in 2003 and reached a career-high ranking of No. 9 in singles in May 2011. He won 13 titles in singles and reached four Grand Slam quarterfinals. Almagro announced his retirement during the Murcia Open in April 2019, which would be his last professional tournament.
  Marcos Baghdatis (born 17 June 1985 in Limassol, Cyprus) joined the professional tour in 2003 and reached a career-high ranking of No. 8 in singles in August 2006. He won four singles titles and reached the final at the 2006 Australian Open, losing to Roger Federer. Baghdatis announced that Wimbledon would be his last tournament after receiving a wild card.
  Tomáš Berdych (born 17 September 1985 in Valašské Meziříčí, Czechoslovakia (present-day Czech Republic)) joined the professional tour in 2002 and reached a career-high ranking of No. 4 in singles in May 2015 and No. 54 in doubles in April 2006. He won 13 titles in singles and reached the 2010 Wimbledon final, losing to Rafael Nadal. He also won two titles and reached the 2005 Australian Open quarterfinals in doubles. Additionally, he was a part of the Czech Republic Davis Cup team that won the 2012 and 2013 Davis Cups. Berdych announced his retirement from professional tennis at the end of the 2019 ATP Finals after struggling with injuries.
  Carlos Berlocq (born 3 February 1983 in Chascomús, Argentina) joined the professional tour in 2001 and reached a career-high ranking of No. 37 in singles in March 2012 and No. 50 in doubles in June 2011. He was a part of Argentina's winning Davis Cup team in 2016 and won two titles in both singles and doubles. Berlocq announced his retirement in late December 2019.
  Daniel Brands (born 17 July 1987 in Deggendorf, Germany) joined the professional tour in 2005 and reached a career-high ranking of No. 51 in singles in August 2013. He reached the fourth round in singles at the 2010 Wimbledon Championships. He also won 7 titles in singles on the Challenger Tour. Brands announced his retirement in July 2019 after struggling with a knee injury for two years.
  Víctor Estrella Burgos (born 2 August 1980 in Santiago de los Caballeros, Santiago, Dominican Republic) joined the professional tour in 2002 and reached a career-high ranking of No. 43 in singles in July 2015. He won three singles titles, all of which were consecutive titles at the Ecuador Open. He also won 7 Challenger titles and was a runner-up at two tournaments in doubles. At the time of his retirement, he was the highest ranked Dominican tennis player in history. Estrella announced that his last tournament would be the Santo Domingo Open in October.
  David Ferrer (born 2 April 1982 in Xàbia, Alicante, Spain) joined the professional tour in 2000 and reached a career-high ranking of No. 3 in singles in July 2013. In singles, he won 27 titles and was runner-up at the 2007 Tennis Masters Cup and the 2013 French Open. He also won the Davis Cup three times in 2008, 2009 and 2011. In doubles, he won two titles and finished in fourth place at the 2012 Summer Olympics alongside Feliciano López. Ferrer played his last tournament at the Madrid Open.
  Andreas Haider-Maurer (born 22 March 1987 in Zwettl, Austria) joined the professional tour in 2005 and reached a career-high ranking of No. 47 in singles in April 2015. He won 9 Challenger titles and retired due to injuries in January 2019. 
  Marcin Matkowski (born 15 January 1981 in Barlinek, Poland) joined the professional tour in 2003 and reached a career-high ranking of No. 7 in doubles in July 2012. In doubles, he won 18 titles and was a runner-up at the 2011 US Open and the 2011 ATP World Tour Finals alongside Mariusz Fyrstenberg. In mixed doubles, he was a runner-up at the 2012 US Open and 2015 French Open. Matkowski plans to retire at either the Szczecin Challenger or the Davis Cup in September.
  Hans Podlipnik Castillo (born 9 January 1988 in Lo Barnechea, Chile) joined the professional tour in 2005 and reached a career-high ranking of No. 43 in doubles in February 2018. He won one title, 20 Challenger titles and reached one Grand Slam quarterfinal in doubles. Podlipnik announced his retirement after his participation with Chile at the 2019 Davis Cup Finals.
  Michał Przysiężny (born 16 February 1984 in Głogów, Poland) joined the professional tour in 2001 and reached a career-high ranking of No. 57 in singles in January 2014. He won one doubles title, one Challenger doubles title and 8 Challenger singles titles. Przysiężny announced that the Sopot Open would be his last tournament.
  Daniel Muñoz de la Nava (born 29 January 1982 in Madrid, Spain) joined the professional tour in 1999 and reached a career-high ranking of No. 68 in singles in February 2016. He played mostly on the Challenger Tour, where he won four titles.
  Tim Smyczek (born 30 December 1987 in Milwaukee, Wisconsin, United States) joined the professional tour in 2006 and reached a career-high ranking of No. 68 in singles in April 2015. He made the semifinals of Newport in 2018. Additionally, he won 7 titles on the Challenger Tour. His last match was at the 2019 Citi Open.
  Janko Tipsarević (born 22 June 1984 in Belgrade, Yugoslavia (present day Serbia)) joined the professional tour in 2002 and reached a career-high ranking of No. 8 in singles in April 2012 and No. 46 in doubles in April 2011. He won four titles in singles and one in doubles, as well as reaching two Grand Slam quarterfinals in both. He was also part of the Serbia Davis Cup team that won the 2010 Davis Cup. Tipsarević announced in August 2019 that the 2019 Davis Cup Finals would be his last professional competition.

Comebacks
Following are notable players who came back after retirements during the 2019 ATP Tour season:
 Nicolás Massú (born 10 October 1979 in Viña del Mar, Chile) joined the professional tour in 1997 and reached a career-high ranking of No. 9 in singles in September 2004 and No. 31 in doubles in July 2005. Massú won two gold medals at the 2004 Summer Olympics, defeating Mardy Fish in singles and alongside Fernando González in doubles, as well as 5 other singles titles. He came back to the tour as a wild card pairing with Moritz Thiem in the doubles of the 2019 Generali Open Kitzbühel.

See also

2019 WTA Tour
2019 ATP Challenger Tour
Association of Tennis Professionals
International Tennis Federation

References

External links
Association of Tennis Professionals (ATP) Tour official website
International Tennis Federation (ITF) official website

 
ATP Tour seasons
ATP Tour